Gtichavank (or ) is a 13th-century Armenian Apostolic monastery, located near the village of Tugh (or Togh) in Azerbaijan, in the disputed region of Nagorno-Karabakh.

History 
The monastery came under the control of the breakaway Republic of Artsakh in the First Nagorno-Karabakh War. It was captured by Azerbaijan during the 2020 Nagorno-Karabakh war.

Janapar Trail 
The remains of the monastery is reachable to hikers via the Janapar Trail, a long-distance trail from Vardenis in Armenia to Hadrut in Artsakh. Another trail leading to this monastery is the Gtichavank Loop Trail starting in the village of Togh. In 2018 the trail was cleared of overgrown vegetation and was marked with red and white painted blazes by the Trails For Change NGO. From the monastery, its possible to continue down the Gtichavank Loop Trail or to take the Janapar Trail down to Togh. From the monastery, its possible to take either the unmarked trail behind the monastery back to Togh or the Janapar Trail.

Gallery

See also 

 Culture of Artsakh
 Architecture of Azerbaijan

References

External links 
 Gtichavank Monastery on Armeniapedia.org
 About Gtichavank

Armenian culture
Armenian buildings in Azerbaijan
Armenian Apostolic Church
Armenian Apostolic churches
Armenian Apostolic monasteries
Armenian Apostolic monasteries in Azerbaijan
Christian monasteries in the Republic of Artsakh
Christian monasteries in Azerbaijan
Churches in Azerbaijan
Oriental Orthodox congregations established in the 13th century
Christian monasteries established in the 13th century